Wald is a municipality in the district of Sigmaringen in Baden-Württemberg in Germany.

Girl School

Kloster Wald
The students get to know the different workshops in a trial week in class 8. They can decide for one of the artisanal trainings according to their interests and abilities. The training starts parallel to school in class 9 on one afternoon per week until the graduation. After that, the training continues in theory and practice full-time until ensuing spring.

Staate journeyman's examinations
body under public law, the proper Chamber of Crafts.

References

Sigmaringen (district)